Hanner may refer to:-

4664 Hanner, a Main-belt Asteroid
Hanner's inequalities, results in the theory of Lp spaces
Bob Hanner (1945-2019), American businessman and politician
Dave Hanner (1930-2008), American football player, coach, and scout
Hanner Fieldhouse,a multi-purpose arena in Statesboro, Georgia, United States
Corbin/Hanner, American country music group